"Great Is the Lord" is a popular worship song written in 1982 by Debbie and Michael W. Smith. The couple were at the time active members of Belmont Church on Music Row in Nashville, Tennessee and were seeking to augment the music.  The inspiration for the lyrics were drawn from Psalm 145:3, "Great is the Lord and most worthy of Praise". The song is sung in churches of many denominations and is included in many hymnal supplements.

Musically, the song is a mix between the pop and worship styles of the day. The song is set in 6/8 time, with an upbeat tempo. The verses are in the key of D major, while the chorus drops down to C major. The song uses several synthesizers, as well as an acoustic piano, to carry along the verses. Guitar, additional vocals and a string section show up in the chorus.

Sources
Great Is the Lord, a modern-day psalm for worship, Today's Christian, May/June 2000 (article includes lyrics)

1983 debut singles
Michael W. Smith songs
Songs written by Michael W. Smith
Reunion Records singles
1982 songs